Baldy Mountain Resort is a family friendly ski resort overlooking the Okanagan Valley in southern British Columbia just north of the Washington state border.  Its road access is via McKinney Road from Oliver and from BC Highway 33 north of Bridesville and BC Highway 3 west of Rock Creek, in the Boundary Country. Air access from Penticton Regional Airport (Air Canada from Vancouver, Westjet from Calgary). The summit is in the Okanagan Highland, an intermediary plateau-like area between the Monashee Mountains to the east and the Okanagan Valley immediately below to the west.

In 1968, its first season, Mt. Baldy Ski Area operated as a ski cat area with McKinney T-Bar. A year later, the resort acquired a Poma T-bar that traveled up the face of Mount Baldy. The T-bar base at 5650 ft above sea level is the highest base altitude of any ski resort in Canada. The Poma T-bar was replaced with the former Blue Chair (double Mueller lift) from Mount Washington on Vancouver Island. This lift is now called the Eagle Chair.

Sugarlump lift was installed in 2007. The Sugarlump lift is a Leitner Poma fixed-grip quad chair lift. Total uphill capacity is 750 persons per hour.  Baldy Mountain Resort consists of 35 downhill skiing trails. In 2012 a trail was cut leading from Sugarlump to the McKinney area to access the terrain park.  Nordic trails are also open December through March.

The hill is unique as the associated village of 150 ski cottages are ski-in ski-out, although the strata is not associated with the ski hill..

There is a ski school, day-lodge and lounge, ski equipment rentals and snow shoe rentals are available in the Snow Sports Centre.

The ski hill did not open for the 2013-14 season due to financial difficulties.

In July 2014, the Supreme Court of British Columbia granted conduct of sale in a foreclosure action to a secured creditor of Mount Baldy.  In the foreclosure, G-Force Real Estate Inc. of Vancouver, B.C. has been appointed as Marketing Agent to sell most of the assets of Mount Baldy Ski Corporation and related companies. Mount Baldy did operate during the 2014-15 season, opening middle of January 2015 with just the Sugarlump lift operating along with the magic carpet. Food and liquor service was offered in the lodge.

New ownership took over in 2016 with rebranding the ski area to Baldy Mountain Resort in an attempt to differentiate itself from other ski areas named Mt. Baldy and opened the ski hill successfully for 16/17 season. Baldy Mountain Resort is still in operation under the new ownership with plans to update the infrastructure in the near future.

See also
List of ski areas and resorts in Canada

External links

Ski areas and resorts in the Okanagan
Boundary Country